The wallcreeper (Tichodroma muraria) is a small passerine bird found throughout the high mountains of the Palearctic from southern Europe to central China. It is the only extant member of both the genus Tichodroma and the family Tichodromidae.

Taxonomy and systematics
There is some disagreement among ornithologists as to where the wallcreeper belongs in the taxonomic order. Initially, Linnaeus placed it in the family Certhiidae, along with the treecreepers. The wallcreeper is placed in a monotypic family Tichodromadidae by, amongst others, Clements 2007, while other authorities such as Dickinson 2003 put it in the monotypic Tichodromadinae, a subfamily of the nuthatch family Sittidae. In either case, it is very closely related to the nuthatches. A 2016 phylogenetic study of members in the superfamily Certhioidea suggests it is a sister of the Sittidae. At least one other species of wallcreeper is known from the fossil record, Tichodroma capeki (Late Miocene of Polgardi, Hungary).

The genus name Tichodroma comes from the Ancient Greek teikhos "wall", and dromos "runner". The specific muraria is Medieval Latin for "of walls", from Latin murus, "wall". Alternatively, the wallcreeper is named the red-winged wall creeper.

Subspecies
Two subspecies are recognized:
 European wallcreeper (T. m. muraria) - (Linnaeus, 1766): Found from southern and eastern Europe to the Caucasus and western Iran
 T. m. nepalensis - Bonaparte, 1850: Originally described as a separate species. Found from Kazakhstan, Turkmenistan and eastern Iran to eastern China

Description
Its  is primarily blue-grey, with darker flight and tail feathers. Its most striking plumage feature, though, are its extraordinary crimson wings. Largely hidden when the wings are folded, this bright colouring covers most of the covert feathers, and the basal half of the primaries and secondaries. The subspecies T. m. nepalensis is slightly darker than the nominate race.

Vocalizations
Though largely silent, both male and female wallcreepers sing, the females generally only while defending feeding territories in the winter.  The song is a high-pitched, drawn-out whistle, with notes that alternately rise and fall.  During the breeding season, the male sings while perched or climbing.

Distribution and habitat

It is largely resident across its range, but moves to lower elevations in winter, when it is found on buildings and in quarries. In France it regularly and repeatedly winters on cathedrals and viaducts in Brittany and Normandy. Birds have wintered as far afield as England and the Netherlands, where one spent two consecutive winters between 1989 and 1991 at the Vrije Universiteit in Amsterdam. The species is resident across much of the Himalayas, ranging across India, Nepal, Bhutan and parts of Tibet and also as a winter visitor in Bangladesh.

Behaviour and ecology

This species can be quite tame, but is often surprisingly difficult to see on mountain faces. While it may be confiding in the breeding and non-breeding seasons, and vagrant birds especially are extremely tame, they will still hide when they are aware of being watched, and will hesitate before entering the nest and even take roundabout routes towards the nest during prolonged observations.

Wallcreepers are territorial, and pairs vigorously defend their breeding territory during the summer. During the winter the wallcreeper is solitary, with males and females defending individual feeding territories. The size of these feeding territories is hard to estimate but may comprise a single large quarry or rock massif; or, alternatively, a series of smaller quarries and rock faces. Wallcreepers may travel some distances from roosting sites to feeding territories. They have also been demonstrated showing site fidelity to winter feeding territories in consecutive years.

Breeding
The female wallcreeper builds a cup nest of grass and moss, sheltered deep in a rock crevice, hole or cave. The nest is lined with softer materials, often including feathers or wool, and typically has two entrances. The female usually lays 4–5 eggs, though clutches as small as three have been found.  The white eggs measure 21 mm long, and are marked with a small number of black or reddish-brown speckles.  Once her entire clutch has been laid, the female incubates the eggs for 19–20 days, until they hatch. During incubation, she is regularly fed by her mate. Young are altricial, which means they are blind, featherless and helpless at birth. Both parents feed the nestlings for a period of 28–30 days, until the young birds fledge.  Each pair raises a single brood a year.

Feeding
The wallcreeper is an insectivore, feeding on terrestrial invertebrates—primarily insects and spiders—gleaned from rock faces.  It sometimes also chases flying insects in short sallies from a rock wall perch. Feeding birds move across a cliff face in short flights and quick hops, often with their wings partially spread.

References

External links
 
 
 
 Neveu Frank, Salamandre Films. (ed) 2013. Like a butterfly - The incredible life of the wallcreeper

Tichodroma
Birds of Eurasia
Birds of Western China